An ICE table or RICE box or RICE chart is a tabular system of keeping track of changing concentrations in an equilibrium reaction. ICE stands for initial, change, equilibrium. It is used in chemistry to keep track of the changes in amount of substance of the reactants and also organize a set of conditions that one wants to solve with. Some sources refer to a RICE table (or box or chart) where the added R stands for the reaction to which the table refers. Others simply call it a concentration table (for the acid–base equilibrium).

Example 
To illustrate the processes, consider the case of dissolving a weak acid, HA, in water. The pH can be calculated using an ICE table. Note that in this example, we are assuming that the acid is not very weak, and that the concentration is not very dilute, so that the concentration of [OH−] ions can be neglected.  This is equivalent to the assumption that the final pH will be below about 6 or so.  See Calculations of pH for more details.

First write down the equilibrium expression. 
HA <=> {A^-} + {H+}
The columns of the table correspond to the three species in equilibrium.

The first row shows the reaction, which some authors label R and some leave blank.

The second row, labeled I, has the initial conditions:  the nominal concentration of acid is Ca and it is initially undissociated, so the concentrations of A− and H+ are zero.

The third row, labeled C, specifies the change that occurs during the reaction.  When the acid dissociates, its concentration changes by an amount , and the concentrations of A− and H+ both change by an amount . This follows from consideration of mass balance (the total number of each atom/molecule must remain the same) and charge balance (the sum of the electric charges before and after the reaction must be zero).

Note that the coefficients in front of the "x" correlate to the mole ratios of the reactants to the product. For example, if the reaction equation had 2 H+ ions in the product, then the "change" for that cell would be "2x"

The fourth row, labeled E, is the sum of the first two rows and shows the final concentrations of each species at equilibrium.

It can be seen from the table that, at equilibrium, [H+] = x.

To find x, the acid dissociation constant (that is, the equilibrium constant for acid-base dissociation) must be specified.

Substitute the concentrations with the values found in the last row of the ICE table.

With specific values for Ca and Ka this quadratic equation can be solved for x. Assuming that pH = −log10[H+] the pH can be calculated as pH = −log10x.

If the degree of dissociation is quite small, Ca ≫ x and the expression simplifies to

and pH =  (pKa − log Ca). This approximate expression is good for pKa values larger than about 2 and concentrations high enough.

References 

Equilibrium chemistry
Physical chemistry